The Department of Social Policy at the London School of Economics is the UK's oldest and most prestigious academic centre for the study and research of social policy. It hosts and contributes to over ten different research centres including the Centre for the Analysis of Social Exclusion, LSE Health and Social Care and the Mannheim Centre for Criminology. Additionally it is home to the British Society for Population Studies.
Notable current faculty members include Paul Dolan, Sir John Hills, Martin Knapp, Julian Le Grand, Elias Mossialos, Eileen Munro, Tim Newburn, David Piachaud and Anne West. Former faculty members include William Beveridge, Richard Titmuss, Peter Townsend and Augustus Nuwagaba.

Academic reputation 

The department has the highest Research Assessment Exercise score of any social policy centre in the UK. Over 50% of work submitted was considered world leading and 80% was considered world leading or internationally excellent. The department frequently ranks first in the field across UK university league tables. It has the highest entry requirements of any social policy course in the UK.

The department prides itself on its policy influence and its research centres are often commissioned by international organisations, national governments and the private sector.

Research 

Research in the department is diverse and interdisciplinary. The background of staff in the department include economics, political science, sociology, health economics, demography and behavioural psychology. The department has active research in a broad range of substantive areas including poverty and social exclusion, health policy, education policy, housing policy, children and families policy, welfare and work, behavioural public policy and demography. The geographic focus of research in the department is equally broad and includes both OECD and developing countries.

Teaching 

The department offers both undergraduate and postgraduate courses. At undergraduate level it is possible to read for a single honours in social policy or joint honours of social policy with government, economics, sociology or criminology. Taught postgraduate courses are offered both with a sole focus on social policy and in conjunction with other departments including government, economics and development studies. The doctoral programme is offered in social policy only. The department also offers a range of executive programmes tailored to mid-career professionals working in public or social policy.

References 

London School of Economics
Social policy
University departments in England
1912 establishments in England